Chraime ( haraime) is a spicy fish stew with tomatoes from Northern Africa. The name of the dish comes from the Arabic word for "hot".

Chraime is traditionally eaten by Jews on Erev Shabbat as well as on Rosh Hashanah and Passover for the Seder. Libyan-Jewish immigrants have popularized the dish in Israel.

See also
Arab cuisine
Harira
Cuisine of the Mizrahi Jews
Cuisine of the Sephardic Jews

References

External links
Chraime recipe from Chabad

Algerian cuisine
Arab cuisine
Israeli cuisine
Jews and Judaism in Algeria
Jews and Judaism in Libya
Jews and Judaism in Morocco
Jews and Judaism in Tunisia
Libyan cuisine
Mizrahi Jewish cuisine
Moroccan cuisine
Maghrebi Jewish culture in Israel
Passover foods
Rosh Hashanah foods
Sephardi Jewish cuisine
Shabbat food
Tunisian cuisine
Stews
Fish dishes
Tomato dishes
Spicy foods